Jonathan Penner (born 1940 in Bridgeport, Connecticut) is an American writer.

Life
He graduated from the University of Bridgeport and from the University of Iowa with an M.F.A., M.A., and Ph.D, which he earned in 1966.  He was a Postdoctoral Fellow at the University of Edinburgh.  He taught at the New School for Social Research, Southern Illinois University, Vanderbilt University, and the University of Hawaii.  
Since 1978 he has lived in Tucson; he has been married since 1968 to Lucille Recht Penner. He is now emeritus (retired) from the University of Arizona's Creative Writing Program. He believes the fiction workshop is fundamental to the academic practice of learning creative writing.

His stories have appeared in Grand Street, Paris Review, Commentary, Ploughshares.

Awards
 1983 Drue Heinz Literature Prize, for  Private Parties 
 National Endowment for the Arts Fellowship
 Guggenheim Fellowship
 Arizona Commission on the Arts Fellowship
 Fulbright Fellowship to Yugoslavia
 2002 Spokane Prize for Short Fiction, for This is My Voice

Works

Novels

Short Stories

Anthologies

References

1940 births
Living people
Writers from Bridgeport, Connecticut
American male writers
University of Bridgeport alumni
American expatriates in the United Kingdom
The New School faculty
Southern Illinois University faculty
Vanderbilt University faculty
University of Hawaiʻi faculty
University of Arizona faculty
Iowa Writers' Workshop alumni